Jere Alan Gillis (born January 18, 1957) is an American-born Canadian former professional ice hockey player, actor and stuntman.

Background
Gillis was born in Bend, Oregon and raised in Montreal, the son of skier Gene Gillis (a member of the American alpine skiing team for the 1948 Winter Olympics), and Rhona Wurtele, a Canadian Olympic skier who competed at the 1948 Winter Olympics. His sister Margie Gillis is a dancer and choreographer, and member of the Order of Canada. His older brother Christopher Gillis was also an important dancer and choreographer, and a member of the Paul Taylor Dance Company.

Playing career
As a youth, Gillis played in the 1970 Quebec International Pee-Wee Hockey Tournament with a minor ice hockey team from Mount Royal, Quebec.

Drafted fourth overall in the 1977 NHL amateur draft by the Vancouver Canucks, Gillis played in the National Hockey League (NHL) from 1977 to 1987 for the Canucks, New York Rangers, Quebec Nordiques, Buffalo Sabres and Philadelphia Flyers. From 1988 to 1991, he played in the United Kingdom for Solihull Barons and Peterborough Pirates, finally playing five games in the Quebec Senior Provincial Hockey League in 1996–97.

Personal life
Upon retiring from ice hockey he became a stuntman in movies as well as a Scientologist.

Career statistics

Regular season and playoffs

International

All statistics are taken from eliteprospects.com.

References

External links
 

1957 births
Living people
American men's ice hockey left wingers
American stunt performers
Buffalo Sabres players
Bishop's College School alumni
Canadian ice hockey left wingers
Canadian stunt performers
Cincinnati Stingers draft picks
Fredericton Express players
Hershey Bears players
Ice hockey people from Oregon
National Hockey League first-round draft picks
New York Rangers players
Philadelphia Flyers players
Quebec Nordiques players
Rochester Americans players
Sherbrooke Castors players
Sportspeople from Bend, Oregon
Vancouver Canucks draft picks
Vancouver Canucks players
Ice hockey people from Montreal
American emigrants to Canada